The 1992 Camel GT Championship and Exxon Supreme GT Series seasons were the 22nd season of the IMSA GT Championship auto racing series.  It was for GTP and Lights classes of prototypes, as well as Grand Tourer-style racing cars which ran in the GTS, GTO, and GTU classes.  It began February 1, 1992, and ended October 11, 1992, after fifteen rounds.

Schedule
The GT and Prototype classes did not participate in all events, nor did they race together at shorter events.  Races marked with All had all classes on track at the same time.

Season results

Prototypes

† - The 24 Hours of Daytona was won by Nissan Motorsports, but their car did not comply with GTP rules and therefore did not score points.  Jaguar Racing was the highest finishing GTP class car.

Grand Tourers

† - The GTO class was combined with the GTS class for Daytona and Sebring.

External links
 World Sports Racing Prototypes - 1992 IMSA GT Championship results

IMSA GT Championship seasons
IMSA GT